Ward Edwards (1927–2005) was an American psychologist, prominent for work on decision theory and on the formulation and revision of beliefs.

Education

Edwards attended Swarthmore College and then received his Ph.D. in psychology from Harvard University.

Awards
 Frank P. Ramsey Award from the Decision Analysis Society, 1988
 Distinguished Scientific Contributions Award in Applied Psychology, American Psychological Association 1996
 2004 class of Fellows of the Institute for Operations Research and the Management Sciences

"The Association for Psychological Science named Ward Edwards as a James McKeen Cattell Fellow in recognition of his sustained and seminal contributions to the technology of decision making and to behavioral decision theory", James McKeen Cattell Fellow Award, 1995.

Research
Edwards published more than one hundred journal articles and books including Decision Analysis and Behavioral Research and Utility Theories: Measurement and Applications. In the introduction to a festschrift for Edwards, Barbara Mellers states

Decision Science and Technology is a compilation of chapters written in honor of a remarkable man, Ward Edwards. Among Ward's many contributions are two significant accomplishments, either of which would have been enough for a very distinguished career.  First, Ward is the founder of behavioral decision theory. This interdisciplinary discipline addresses the question of how people actually confront decisions, as opposed to the question of how they should make decisions. Second, Ward laid the groundwork for sound normative systems by noticing which tasks humans can do well and which tasks computers should perform.

In 1962, Edwards founded the Bayesian Research Conference with the aim to incorporate and apply Bayesian statistical methods and ideas to decision theory. This conference was renamed the "Edwards Bayesian Research Conference" in his honor in 2005.  In statistics he is well known as lead author of the review article "Bayesian Statistical Inference for Psychological Research," which introduced the notion of 'stable estimation', and was the first to note that a p-value of 0.05 in the normal linear model corresponded to a lower bound on the Bayes factor of 0.26.

References

External links
Biography of Ward Edwards from the Institute for Operations Research and the Management Sciences

1927 births
2005 deaths
20th-century American psychologists
Harvard Graduate School of Arts and Sciences alumni
Swarthmore College alumni
Fellows of the Institute for Operations Research and the Management Sciences